Perica Stančeski (born 29 January 1985) is a Macedonian former professional footballer who played as a midfielder.

Club career
After coming through the youth system at Partizan, Stančeski was sent out on loan to Hajduk Beograd in 2003. He later also played on loan for Teleoptik in the Serbian League Belgrade and Bežanija in the Serbian SuperLiga. His only appearance for Partizan came in the 2005–06 season.

In July 2008, Stančeski signed a three-year contract with Čukarički. He left the club after just one season. In October 2009, Stančeski joined Bosnian side Borac Banja Luka. He spent a little over a year there before being released.

In January 2015, Stančeski moved to Kyrgyzstan and signed with Dordoi Bishkek. He however left the club without making an appearance.

International career
Stančeski represented Serbia and Montenegro at under-17 (as FR Yugoslavia) and under-19 levels. He took part in the 2002 UEFA European Under-17 Championship, helping his team reach the quarter-finals.

In 2006, Stančeski switched allegiance to Macedonia, making his debut for the under-21 team in September of the same year. He won his only senior cap for Macedonia on 22 December 2010, playing in a 1–0 away friendly loss to China.

Notes

References

External links
 
 
 
 
 

1985 births
Living people
Footballers from Belgrade
Serbian people of Macedonian descent
Association football midfielders
Serbia and Montenegro footballers
Macedonian footballers
North Macedonia international footballers
North Macedonia under-21 international footballers
FK Partizan players
FK Hajduk Beograd players
FK Teleoptik players
FK Bežanija players
FK Čukarički players
FK Borac Banja Luka players
FK Željezničar Sarajevo players
FK BSK Borča players
NK Zvijezda Gradačac players
FK Rad players
FC Dordoi Bishkek players
HNK Orašje players
FK Metalurg Skopje players
FK Mačva Šabac players
First League of Serbia and Montenegro players
Serbian SuperLiga players
Premier League of Bosnia and Herzegovina players
First League of the Federation of Bosnia and Herzegovina players
Macedonian First Football League players
Serbian First League players
Macedonian expatriate footballers
Expatriate footballers in Bosnia and Herzegovina
Macedonian expatriate sportspeople in Bosnia and Herzegovina
Expatriate footballers in Kyrgyzstan